Chinese poker is a card game based on poker hand rankings. It is intended as a beginner-friendly game, with only a basic knowledge of poker hand rankings needed to get started. The format allows for frequent unexpected outcomes due to the large element of luck involved, meaning a beginner has a good chance of winning in the short term against even experienced opponents.

Gameplay
Chinese poker is typically played as a four-person game, though it can also be played with two or three.

Playing a hand

In Chinese poker, each player receives a 13-card hand from a standard 52-card deck. Each player then has to divide their cards into three poker hands (known as "setting"): two containing five cards each (known as "the middle" and "the back"), and one containing three cards ("the front"); the back must be the highest-ranking hand, and the front, the lowest-ranking hand (note that straights and flushes do not count in the three-card hand). The back hand is placed face down on the table in front of the player, then the middle hand is placed face down in front of the back hand, and the front hand is placed face down in front of the middle hand. After all the players have set their hands, each player will announce in turn (clockwise, starting from the left of the dealer) whether or not they are playing their hand. All players then announce their royalties, before revealing their hands.

If a player makes three flushes or three straights they automatically win the hand, regardless of the other players' hands. As shown in the photo, the middle player has made all three hands flush and is an automatic winner.

Scoring
The stakes played for in Chinese poker are known as units: an amount of money agreed on before the game starts. Basic scoring rules dictate that a player collects one unit from each opponent whose front, middle or back hand is beaten by their own corresponding hand. Thus, unlike most poker games, being second-best at the table is good enough to win money. In some variants players are also paid an additional unit if they win in two or three of the hands. In other variants players only get an additional unit if they win all three hands (known as a scoop). Also, due to the head-to-head nature of the comparisons, it is possible for different players to play for different stakes. For example, A and B could play for $100 per unit versus each other, while all other player pairings play for $10 per unit.

The two most common scoring systems used in Chinese poker are the 2–4 scoring method, and the 1–6 scoring method.

In the 2–4 method the player receives 1 unit for each of the three hands they win, and 1 unit called the overall unit is awarded to the player who wins two out of the three hands, or all of the three hands. In the event of a tie in one of the hands, no money is exchanged for this particular hand. If one player wins both of the other two hands, they collect 3 units (1 for each hand, and 1 overall). If they each win one hand, no units are exchanged (each win 1 unit, and there is no overall).

In the 1–6 method the player receives 1 unit for each of the three hands they win, and 3 bonus units (on top of the three for the hands) if they win all three hands.

Example

In the 2–4 method, Bob would pay Amy two units; Amy receives two points for winning front and back, loses one for losing middle and receives one as the overall unit for winning two out of three hands. In the 1–6 method, Bob would pay Amy one unit; again Amy receives two points for winning front and back and loses one for losing middle, but they do not receive any bonus units.

Royalties
Royalties, or bonuses as they are sometimes called, are extra units that may be awarded to players with particularly strong hands.

Royalties must be declared prior to the revealing of the hands.

Some hands and combinations of hands that are commonly awarded royalties are:

 Straight flush
 Four of a kind
 Full house in the middle
 Three of a kind in the front

Naturals

Naturals are special types of royalties where if dealt to a player, the player is rewarded immediately (prior to anyone surrendering), and the player does not set their hand:

 Three straights
 Three flushes
 Six pairs (counting all three hands)
 Four Three of a kind
 Three Four of a kind
 Three Straight flush
 13 unique cards (i.e. 2, 3, 4, 5, 6, 7, 8, 9, 10, J, Q, K, A) known as a Dragon

Naturals variants
 No picture cards (Ace counts as a non-picture card)
 All picture cards (including Ace)
 Six and above (Ace counts as above)
 12 or 13 of one colour

Players with the stronger natural wins and takes the bonus. If two players have six pair the player with the highest six pair wins otherwise it is a tie and no bonus is awarded. With flushes and straights the player with the highest back hand wins if that ties then the middle hand is compared. If that also ties then the front is compared.

In some variants all royalties are worth the same amount (e.g., 1 unit per royalty). In other variants each royalty is given a different payout (e.g., 1 unit for a four of a kind in the back, and 2 units for a straight flush in the back). Normally only the winner may be awarded a royalty (e.g., four sevens in the back beats four sixes in the back; therefore, only the player with sevens is awarded a royalty). Some modified rule sets allow the royalty bonus to cancel out and only the point for the hand/row is added. In some games players are allowed to break up straight flushes or four of a kinds and still receive royalties (e.g., a player is dealt four sevens; they may use three of them for a three of a kind in the front, and one as part of a straight in the middle). Some rules say that players are only allowed to claim one royalty per hand. The standard royalties point structure is listed below.

Point structure for royalties
While the royalty structure varies from game to game, the most common agreed-upon royalty structure is as follows:

* Non-standard natural; ^Variant-based natural

Surrendering
If a player chooses to surrender their hand, they will pay an amount greater than the amount paid when losing at least two hands, but less than the amount paid when getting scooped. When surrendered, a player is not required to pay any royalties to their opponents. In some variations surrendering is not an option.

Scoop/Home-run
In a Taiwanese variant, When a player loses all three hands to a certain player, it is considered scooped (打槍; Dǎqiāng) and is paid double of the base points. If a player scoops all three players, it is considered home-run (全壘打; Quánlěidǎ) and the payment is further doubled. However, calling a natural hand exempts it from scooping and thus scored separately.

Mis-set hand
If a player mis-sets their hand (e.g., they put three of a kind in the front, but only two pair in the middle) then they must pay each of their opponents still in the hand (players who have not surrendered) an amount equal to being scooped. In some variations players are still required to play their hands.

Current status
Chinese Poker was played at the 1995 and the 1996 World Series of Poker. In 1995, the $1,500 event was won by John Tsagaris, and the $5,000 event by Steve Zolotow. In 1996 the $1,500 event was won by Gregory Grivas, and the $5,000 event by Jim Feldhouse. There have been no Chinese Poker events at the World Series of Poker since 1996.

Variations

Open-face Chinese poker

In this variation the players are dealt five cards in the beginning. These cards are arranged faceup on the table to the back, middle, and front hands. The cards cannot be rearranged later. Then the players receive a single card at a time for the remaining 8 cards. This means it is possible to make an illegal hand. This variation originates from Finland.

Other variations
 Low in the middle—In this variation, the middle hand is played as a deuce-to-seven low hand. 
 Criss Cross—This variation is played heads up: each player is dealt two 13 card hands and plays each of their hands against each of their opponents' hands. Players' hands are to be treated as two independent hands; they cannot exchange cards between the two hands.
 In this variation, The Wheel (A, 2, 3, 4, 5) is the second highest straight. Therefore, it is ranked above a 9, 10, J, Q, K straight, but below a 10, J, Q, K, A straight.
 Another variation scores the game 1 point per hand, with the winner of the game being the first to 11 points. If a player wins all 3 hands and there are 4 players, the winning player gets a 4th point.

References

Poker variants
Chinese card games